The Indian Springs Mall, also known as the Indian Springs Shopping Center, was an American enclosed mall in Kansas City, Kansas.  Demolition of the mall began in February 2016. It was built by Copaken, White & Blitt (now Copaken Brooks).Chain Store Age

History and operations
Until its closure, Indian Springs Mall was home to The Children's Museum.  The high crime rate and other factors common to the indoor mall format led to the eventual decline and closing of Indian Springs. It became a dead mall in the mid-1990s but the doors remained open for over ten more years, despite the lack of retailers.

, nothing had taken place yet as for the conversion. In 2011, it was given a new green and gold paint scheme, replacing the mauve and teal colors added during a major update done in the mid-1980s that included new canopies at the entrances highlighted with chrome, glass brick and neon, and inside the mall were new indirect lighting replacing the large 1970s era light sculpture chandeliers, revised planters, benches and fountains in the revised design and color scheme.  The mall was demolished in 2016.

Tenants
Indian Springs Mall opened in 1971. The mall's original anchor stores were the department stores JCPenney, Montgomery Ward, and Macy's (whose space was later occupied by Dillard's).

Before the original mall was shuttered in 2001, Dillard's left the mall first in 1997, followed by JCPenney later that year due to an under-performing store, and finally Montgomery Ward in early 2001 (due to national chain's bankruptcy) with other retailers shuttered that year.

Features
Some the mall's unique aspects were its many fountains; many nearly flush at floor level without guardrails (barriers were added in the 1980s face lift), a full-sized inside walking maze on the bottom floor and a large seasonal "talking Christmas tree" where children could relate their Christmas wishes to the interactive tree (via intercom nestled inside the limbs).

Cinemas
It also featured two different movie theaters; one on each level. The original four-screen theater was a typical early no-frills design. It had a very small concession area and small screens in a long auditorium with a center aisle (commonly referred to as a "shoe box" design). In the early 1980s, a greatly improved six-screen theater was added on the lower level, including a large lobby lit with marquee lights, a full-service and greatly expanded concession stand, much larger screens and a greatly upgraded modern surround sound stereo system along with upgraded seats. Shortly after the newer theater was opened, the original four-screen theater was converted to a discount theater and also specialized in showing children's movies.

See also

 List of shopping malls in the United States

References

http://www.labelscar.com/kansas/indian-springs-mall

Further reading
Smith, Joyce. 2007. Indian springs shopping center seeks bankruptcy protection. McClatchy - Tribune Business News, Mar 26, 2007. .
Wiebe, Mark, and Dawn Bormann. 2008. Unified government negotiates with a developer regarding Indian Springs mall site. McClatchy - Tribune Business News, May 30, 2008. .
Wiebe, Mark. 2001. Printers to move into Indian Springs: Mall is closer to becoming a nonretail center: [METROPOLITAN edition]. Kansas City Star, Mar 09, 2001. .
Nicely, Steve. 1995. Indian Springs will not use zone funds: [METROPOLITAN edition]. Kansas City Star, Jan 19, 1995. .
Mall's owners pick leasing agent: [MID-AMERICA edition]. 1995. Kansas City Star, Aug 04, 1995. .
Butler, Robert W. 1997. The show's over at Indian Springs' super saver theaters: [METROPOLITAN edition]. Kansas City Star, Sep 19, 1997. .
Alm, Rick. 1995. Children's Museum aims to find a new home in '96: Present location in KCK is cramped and costly, director says.: [METROPOLITAN edition]. Kansas City Star, Dec 25, 1995. .
Nicely, Steve. 1996. Outlook brighter for troubled mall: Indian Springs owner charts course for economic recovery.: [METROPOLITAN edition]. Kansas City Star, Sep 28, 1996. .
Smith, Joyce. 1996. Indian springs' temporary test: A status check: One store will stick around, and some others have reported good sales.: [METROPOLITAN edition]. Kansas City Star, Sep 17, 1996. <.
Nicely, Steve. 1995. Local investors drop bid to acquire Indian Springs: [METROPOLITAN edition]. Kansas City Star, Jun 22, 1995. .
LaMoy, Anne. 1996. Indian Springs welcomes new cinema complex: Discount movie house, opening Aug. 30, will show second-run films.: [METROPOLITAN edition]. Kansas City Star, Aug 15, 1996. .
Everly, Steve. 1995. Community police head out for the mall: Shopping center's owners donate office space and equipment.: [MID-AMERICA edition]. Kansas City Star, Dec 17, 1995. .
Karash, Julius A. 1995. Indian springs has new owner: Californians pay an undisclosed amount for troubled KCK mall.: [METROPOLITAN edition]. Kansas City Star, Jun 24, 1995. .
Trollinger, Amy. 1997. Indian springs goes shopping. Kansas City Business Journal (Feb 28): 1, .
Butcher, Lola. 1993. Bad-loan property buries banks, pensions, insurers. Kansas City Business Journal 11, (24) (Mar 05): 20, . (Discusses how Aetna Life Insurance & Annuity Co. came to own mall.)

1971 establishments in Kansas
Buildings and structures in Kansas City, Kansas
Shopping malls in Kansas
Shopping malls established in 1971
Demolished shopping malls in the United States